Christophe Rochus was the defending champion.
Josselin Ouanna won the singles competition, after she won 7–5, 1–6, 6–4, against Adrian Mannarino.

Seeds

Draw

Final four

Top half

Bottom half

References
 Main Draw
 Qualifying Draw

Open Prevadies - Singles
2009 Singles